Pest is a county (vármegye) in central Hungary. It surrounds  the national capital Budapest and the majority of the county's population (65.2%/790,995 in 2009) live in the suburbs of Budapest. The River Danube flows through the county. The capital of Pest County is Budapest (administratively separate), but it is planned to completely separate the capital from the county at least until 2020, as it loses catch-up aids from the European Union because of the high development of Budapest.

History
The present county Pest was formed after World War II, when the former county Pest-Pilis-Solt-Kiskun was split in two parts (the other part is within present-day ). Pest County also existed in the early days of the medieval Kingdom of Hungary (11th century). Its territory comprised approximately the north-eastern part of present Pest County. It was combined with adjacent Pilis county before the 15th century. More information can be found at the entry of former Pest-Pilis-Solt-Kiskun county.

Demographics

In 2015, it had a population of 1,226,115 and the population density was 192/km².

Ethnicity
Besides the Hungarian majority, the main minorities are the Germans (approx. 25,000), Roma (20,000), Slovaks (6,000), Romanians (4,000) and Serbs (1,500).

Total population (2011 census): 1,217,476
Ethnic groups (2011 census):
Identified themselves: 1,090,882 persons:
Hungarians: 1,024,768 (93.94%)
Germans: 24,994 (2.29%)
Gypsies: 20,065 (1.84%)
Others and indefinable: 21,055 (1.93%)
Approx. 178,000 persons in Pest County did not declare their ethnic group at the 2011 census.

Religion

Religious adherence in the county according to 2011 census:

Catholic – 445,106 (Roman Catholic – 435,717; Greek Catholic – 9,235);
Reformed – 134,848;
Evangelical – 32,564; 
Orthodox – 1,796;
Judaism – 947;
Other religions – 26,485; 
Non-religious – 200,430; 
Atheism – 19,869;
Undeclared – 355,431.

Economy 
The Gross domestic product (GDP) of the county was 13.8 billion euros in 2018, accounting for 10.3% of Hungary's economic output. GDP per capita adjusted for purchasing power was 17,000 euros or 56% of the EU27 average in the same year. The GDP per employee was 69% of the EU average.

Regional structure

Politics 

The Pest County Council, elected at the 2019 local government elections, is made up of 44 counselors, with the following party composition:

Presidents of the General Assembly

Municipalities 
Pest County has 1+(Budapest) urban county, 47 towns, 17 large villages and 122 villages.

City with county rights
(ordered by population, as of 2011 census)
Érd (63,631)

Towns

Dunakeszi (40,545)
Cegléd (36,645)
Szigetszentmiklós (34,708)
Vác (33,831)
Gödöllő (32,522)
Budaörs (26,757)
Szentendre (25,310)
Nagykőrös (24,134)
Gyál (23,338)
Dunaharaszti (20,473)
Vecsés (20,088)
Fót (19,068)
Százhalombatta (17,952)
Monor (17,626)
Göd (17,476)
Szigethalom (16,886)
Pomáz (16,622)
Dabas (16,386)
Gyömrő (16,250)
Veresegyház (15,998)
Pécel (15,168)
Abony (14,916)
Pilisvörösvár (13,667)
Budakeszi (13,502)
Törökbálint (12,841)
Biatorbágy (12,484)
Nagykáta (12,467)
Albertirsa (12,016)
Kistarcsa (11,953)
Maglód (11,738)
Pilis (11,568)
Üllő (11,425)
Isaszeg (11,152)
Tököl (10,851)
Budakalász (10,619)
Kerepes (10,068)
Ráckeve (9,755)
Halásztelek (9,200)
Diósd (9,056)
Ócsa (8,985)
Piliscsaba (8,472)
Sülysáp (8,195)
Tura (7,774)
Dunavarsány (7,363)
Őrbottyán (7,102)
Aszód (6,258)
Tápiószele (5,914)
Zsámbék (5,174)
Örkény (4,730)
Nagymaros (4,679)
Szob (2,794)
Újhartyán (2,685)
Visegrád (1,718)

Villages

Acsa
Alsónémedi 
Apaj
Áporka
Bag 
Bénye
Bernecebaráti
Budajenő
Bugyi 
Ceglédbercel
Csemő
Csévharaszt
Csobánka
Csomád
Csömör 
Csörög
Csővár
Dánszentmiklós
Dány
Délegyháza
Domony
Dömsöd 
Dunabogdány
Ecser 
Erdőkertes
Farmos
Felsőpakony
Galgagyörk
Galgahévíz
Galgamácsa
Gomba
Herceghalom
Hernád
Hévízgyörk
Iklad
Inárcs
Ipolydamásd
Ipolytölgyes
Jászkarajenő
Kakucs
Kartal 
Káva
Kemence
Kiskunlacháza 
Kismaros
Kisnémedi
Kisoroszi
Kocsér
Kosd
Kóka
Kőröstetétlen
Kóspallag
Leányfalu 
Letkés
Lórév
Majosháza
Makád
Márianosztra
Mende
Mikebuda
Mogyoród 
Monorierdő
Nagybörzsöny
Nagykovácsi 
Nagytarcsa
Nyáregyháza
Nyársapát
Pánd
Páty
Penc
Perbál
Perőcsény
Péteri
Pilisborosjenő
Pilisjászfalu
Pilisszántó
Pilisszentiván
Pilisszentkereszt
Pilisszentlászló
Pócsmegyer
Pusztavacs
Pusztazámor
Püspökhatvan
Püspökszilágy
Rád
Remeteszőlős
Solymár 
Sóskút
Szada
Szentlőrinckáta
Szentmártonkáta
Szigetbecse
Szigetcsép
Szigetmonostor
Szigetszentmárton
Szigetújfalu
Szokolya
Sződ
Sződliget
Tahitótfalu
Taksony 
Tatárszentgyörgy
Táborfalva
Tápióbicske
Tápiógyörgye
Tápióság
Tápiószecső 
Tápiószentmárton 
Tápiószőlős
Tárnok 
Telki
Tésa
Tinnye
Tóalmás
Tök
Törtel
Újlengyel
Újszilvás
Úri
Üröm
Valkó 
Vasad
Vácduka
Vácegres
Váchartyán
Váckisújfalu
Vácrátót
Vácszentlászló
Vámosmikola
Verőce
Verseg
Zebegény
Zsámbok

 municipalities are large villages.

Gallery

International relations 
Pest County has a partnership relationship with:

References

External links

 in Hungarian and English

 
Counties of Hungary